This article provides details of international football games played by the France national football team from 2020 to present. The team reached the UEFA Nations League Finals for the first time. Later, they finished as top of Group F often described as Group of death in Euro 2020. Les Bleus won their World Cup group and defeated Poland, heavyweights England and underdogs Morocco to advance to the final for the second consecutive tournament. However, after a 3–3 tie and a penalty shootout loss to Argentina, they were unable to successfully defend their championship title.

Results

2020

2021

2022

2023

Head to head records

Notes

References

Football in France
France national football team
2020s in French sport
France national football team results